USS Jacamar may refer to the following ships of the United States Navy:

 , was a wooden-hulled coastal minesweeper launched 10 March 1941 and sold in 1947
  was launched as LSIL-870 on 2 October 1944, and renamed Jacamar 7 March 1952

United States Navy ship names